The 2016 Tennessee State Tigers football team represented Tennessee State University as a member of the Ohio Valley Conference (OVC) in the 2016 NCAA Division I FCS football season. They were led by seventh-year head coach Rod Reed and played their home games at Nissan Stadium and Hale Stadium. Tennessee State finished the season 7–4 overall and 4–3 in OVC play to place fourth.

Schedule

Game summaries

Arkansas–Pine Bluff

vs. Jackson State

at Bethune-Cookman

Tennessee–Martin

at Eastern Illinois

Eastern Kentucky

at Vanderbilt

at Murray State

at Austin Peay

Tennessee Tech

at Southeast Missouri State

Ranking movements

References

Tennessee State
Tennessee State Tigers football seasons
Tennessee State Tigers football